The Soueast DX9 is an upcoming mid-size SUV to be produced by Chinese automobile manufacturer Soueast Motors.

Overview
MIIT images of the Soueast DX9 surfaced online in June 2020. Positioned above the Soueast DX7, the DX9 will be the flagship SUV of the Soueast brand. It is the first Soueast vehicle to wear the company's new logo.

Specifications
The Soueast DX9 is powered by a 1.8L turbocharged engine that outputs 245 horsepower.

External links
 Soueast DX9 specifications on ChinaMobil.ru

References

Upcoming car models
Cars of China
Sport utility vehicles